Vučica may refer to:
 Vučica (river), in Croatia
 Vučica, Danilovgrad, Montenegro